The Sanctuary Cove Classic was a golf tournament held in Australia from 1988 to 1992 at Sanctuary Cove Golf and Country Club, Sanctuary Cove, Hope Island, Queensland. The event was not played in 1989 or 1990 and was called the SxL Sanctuary Cove Classic in 1991 and 1992. The 1991 and 1992 events were played on the Pines course. Prize money was A$400,000 in 1988, A$700,000 in 1991 and 1992.

Winners

References

Former PGA Tour of Australasia events
Golf tournaments in Australia
Golf in Queensland
Recurring sporting events established in 1988
Recurring events disestablished in 1992